In the run up to the 2021 Portuguese local elections, various organisations will carry out opinion polling to gauge voting intention in several municipalities across Portugal. Results of such polls are displayed in this article. The date range for these opinion polls are from the previous local elections, held on 1 October 2017, to the day the next elections will be held, on 26 September 2021.

Polling

Alcobaça

Alijó

Almada

Amadora

Armamar

Aveiro

Barcelos

Batalha

Braga

Cabeceiras de Basto

Carrazeda de Ansiães

Coimbra

Elvas

Figueira da Foz

Freixo de Espada à Cinta

Funchal

Gondomar

Guarda

Lamego

Leiria

Lisbon

Loures

Marinha Grande

Matosinhos

Mesão Frio

Moimenta da Beira

Montijo

Murça

Nazaré

Ourém

Palmela

Paços de Ferreira

Penafiel

Penedono

Peso da Régua

Pombal

Ponta do Sol

Porto

Porto de Mós

Porto Santo

Póvoa de Lanhoso

Sabrosa

Santa Cruz

Santa Marta de Penaguião

Santana

Santarém

São João da Madeira

São João da Pesqueira

Seixal

Sernancelhe

Sintra

Tabuaço

Tarouca

Torre de Moncorvo

Vila Franca de Xira

Vila Nova de Famalicão

Vila Nova de Foz Côa

Vila Nova de Gaia

Vila Real

Viseu

Notes

External links 
 ERC - Official publication of polls
 Marktest 2021 local election poll database

Opinion polling in Portugal